Hoazinavis is an extinct genus of early hoatzin from Late Oligocene and Early Miocene (about 24–22 mya) deposits of Brazil. It was collected in 2008 from the Tremembé Formation of São Paulo, Brazil. It was first named by Gerald Mayr, Herculano Alvarenga and Cécile Mourer-Chauviré in 2011 and the type species is Hoazinavis lacustris.

References 

Opisthocomiformes
Oligocene birds
Paleogene birds of South America
Miocene birds of South America
Deseadan
Paleogene Brazil
Neogene Brazil
Fossils of Brazil
Fossil taxa described in 2011
Birds described in 2011
Taxa named by Gerald Mayr